Julia Ann Kalow is an Assistant Professor of Chemistry at Northwestern University. She is primarily a synthetic chemist, who works on polymers, photochemistry and tissue engineering. She is interested in synthetic strategies that can turn molecular structure and chemical reactivity into macroscopic properties. She has been awarded the National Science Foundation CAREER Award, Thieme Award and was selected by the University of Chicago as a Rising Star in Chemistry.

Early life and education 
Kalow is from Newton, Massachusetts. She studied chemistry and creative writing at Columbia University. She played the flute for the Columbia University Wind Ensemble. She worked with James L. Leighton on the synthesis of isocyclocitrinol and on an enantioselective imino-Nazarov reaction. During this placement she became more interested in a research career. She was awarded the Chemistry Undergraduate Award and Brownstein Writing Prize. She was also the salutatorian of her graduating class at Columbia. She worked as an intern at Merck Research Laboratories, where she investigated trifluoromethylation using metal catalysts. In 2008 Kalow joined Princeton University as a graduate student with Abigail Doyle. Together they worked on asymmetric nucleophilic fluorination. She used cooperative catalysis in fluorination reactions, which allowed for selective radiofluorination. Her work was awarded an American Chemical Society Division of Organic Chemistry Graduate Fellowship.

Research and career 
In 2013 Kalow joined Massachusetts Institute of Technology as a postdoctoral fellow with Timothy M. Swager. She worked on telechelic P3HT synthesis, as well as miktoarm polymers using ring-opening metathesis polymerisation. Kalow became interested in the use of complex emulsions in enzyme sensing, as well as self-assembly of block copolymers.

She joined Northwestern University in 2016. She is a member of the National Science Foundation Center for Sustainable Polymers. Her work considers organic synthesis and polymer chemistry, and is interested in photoresponsive materials. This includes creating polymers with controlled chain lengths using selective photoexcitation. To achieve this, Kalow is developing photochemically gated junctions, which allow spatiotemporal control of junction dynamics. These junctions permit for transient regions of fast and slow exchange dynamics, which operate over long length scales. Her group are also developing hydrogels that can be controlled using light. In 2017 Kalow was named a Searle Fellow at Northwestern University.

Selected publications 
Her publications include;

Awards and honours 
Her awards and honours include;

 2021 Sloan Research Fellowship
 2021 Camille Dreyfus Teacher Scholar Award
2019 National Science Foundation CAREER Award
 2019 American Chemical Society PMSE Young Investigator
 2018 3M Non-tenured Faculty Award
 2018 Thieme Chemistry Journal Award
 2017 Air Force Research Laboratory Award
 2015 University of Chicago Rising Star in Chemistry

She is a member of Phi Beta Kappa.

References 

American women chemists
Massachusetts Institute of Technology fellows
Columbia College (New York) alumni
Princeton University alumni
Year of birth missing (living people)
Living people
21st-century American women
Sloan Research Fellows